José "Moncho" Manuel Monsalve, commonly known as Moncho Monsalve (born in Medina del Campo, Castile and León, Spain; 1 January 1945), is a former Spanish professional basketball player and coach.

Biography
As a player, he played at Atlético San Sebastián, Real Madrid (1963–1967), SD Kas and CB Girona. He retired in 1971 due to several injuries.

He succeeded Lula Ferreira in 2008, and coached Brazil at the FIBA Americas Championship 2009, where the team won a gold medal. Prior to this, he served stints with several teams of the Spanish Liga ACB and French Ligue Nationale de Basketball., and also the Castile and León autonomous basketball team.

Monsalve actually coaches the junior squad of CB Murcia.

References

1945 births
Living people
CB Girona players
Real Madrid Baloncesto players
Spanish basketball coaches
Spanish men's basketball players